The 2007 Commonwealth of Independent States Cup was the fifteenth edition of the competition and took place in Moscow beginning January 20. The final took take place in the Olimpiyski Sport Complex on January 28, and was won by Uzbek side Pakhtakor Tashkent 9-8 on a penalty shootout against Ventspils, from Latvia, after a goalless game.

Participants

 1 CSKA Moscow and Shakhtar Donetsk were represented by reserve players.
 2 Banants Yerevan replaced Pyunik Yerevan (2006 Armenian champions), who were not allowed to participate after last year's semifinal incident.
 3 Aktobe replaced Astana (2006 Kazakhstan champions), who declined to participate.
 4 OFK Beograd invited by the organizing committee instead of Russian U21/U19 teams.

Group stage

Group A

Results

Group B

Results

Group C

Results

Group D

Results

Final rounds

Quarterfinals

Semifinals

Finals

Top scorers

References

External links
2007 CIS Cup at rsssf.com
2007 CIS Cup at football.by
2007 CIS Cup at kick-off.by

2007
2007 in Russian football
2006–07 in Ukrainian football
2006–07 in European football
January 2007 sports events in Russia
2007 in Moscow